Ali Al-Nono (born 7 June 1980) is a retired Yemeni professional footballer who played as a striker. He was the captain of the Yemen national football team, and is the all-time highest goalscorer in the history of the Yemeni League.

Club career stats

International goals
Al-Nono has scored at least 29 international goals and is the leading scorer of the Yemen national team.

Honours

Club
Al-Ahli San'a'
Yemeni League: 
1998–99, 1999–00, 2000–01
Yemeni President Cup: 3
2001, 2009
Yemeni Unity Cup: 1
2004

Individual
 Top scorer Yemen League 2007-18: 11 goals.

References

External links 
 

1980 births
Living people
Yemeni footballers
Yemen international footballers
Yemeni expatriate footballers
Association football forwards
Expatriate footballers in Egypt
Expatriate footballers in Syria
Expatriate footballers in Bahrain
Expatriate footballers in Sudan
Yemeni expatriate sportspeople in Egypt
Yemeni expatriate sportspeople in Syria
Yemeni expatriate sportspeople in Bahrain
Yemeni expatriate sportspeople in Sudan
Al Masry SC players
Tishreen SC players
Al-Ahli Club Sana'a players
Al Sha'ab Ibb players
Al-Tilal SC players
Al-Merrikh SC players
Busaiteen Club players
Yemeni League players
Bahraini Premier League players
Egyptian Premier League players
Footballers at the 2002 Asian Games
Asian Games competitors for Yemen
Syrian Premier League players